Neil Richard MacKinnon Gaiman  (born Neil Richard Gaiman; born 10 November 1960) is an English author of short fiction, novels, comic books, graphic novels, nonfiction, audio theatre, and films. His  works include the comic book series The Sandman and novels Stardust, Anansi Boys, American Gods, Coraline, and The Graveyard Book. He has won numerous awards, including the Hugo, Nebula, and Bram Stoker awards, as well as the Newbery and Carnegie medals. He is the first author to win both the Newbery and the Carnegie medals for the same work, The Graveyard Book (2008). In 2013, The Ocean at the End of the Lane was voted Book of the Year in the British National Book Awards. It was later adapted into a critically acclaimed stage play at the Royal National Theatre in London, England that The Independent called "...theatre at its best".

Early life
Gaiman's family is of Polish-Jewish and other Eastern European Jewish origins. His great-grandfather emigrated from Antwerp, Belgium, to the UK before 1914 and his grandfather eventually settled in Portsmouth and established a chain of grocery stores. Gaiman's grandfather changed his original family name of Chaiman to Gaiman. His father, David Bernard Gaiman, worked in the same chain of stores; his mother, Sheila Gaiman (née Goldman), was a pharmacist. He has two younger sisters, Claire and Lizzy.

After living for a period in the nearby town of Portchester, Hampshire, where Neil was born in 1960, the Gaimans moved in 1965 to the West Sussex town of East Grinstead, where his parents studied Dianetics at the Scientology centre in the town; one of Gaiman's sisters works for the Church of Scientology in Los Angeles. His other sister, Lizzy Calcioli, has said, "Most of our social activities were involved with Scientology or our Jewish family. It would get very confusing when people would ask my religion as a kid. I'd say, 'I'm a Jewish Scientologist. Gaiman says that he is not a Scientologist, and that like Judaism, Scientology is his family's religion. About his personal views, Gaiman has stated, "I think we can say that God exists in the DC Universe. I would not stand up and beat the drum for the existence of God in this universe. I don't know, I think there's probably a 50/50 chance. It doesn't really matter to me."

Gaiman was able to read at the age of four. He said, "I was a reader. I loved reading. Reading things gave me pleasure. I was very good at most subjects in school, not because I had any particular aptitude in them, but because normally on the first day of school they'd hand out schoolbooks, and I'd read them—which would mean that I'd know what was coming up, because I'd read it." When he was about ten years old, he read his way through the works of Dennis Wheatley, where especially The Ka of Gifford Hillary and The Haunting of Toby Jugg made an impact on him. 

One work that made a particular impression on him was J. R. R. Tolkien's The Lord of the Rings from his school library. Although the library only had the first two of the novel's three volumes, Gaiman consistently checked them out and read them. He later won the school English prize and the school reading prize, enabling him to finally acquire the third volume.

For his seventh birthday, Gaiman received C. S. Lewis's The Chronicles of Narnia series. He later recalled that "I admired his use of parenthetical statements to the reader, where he would just talk to you ... I'd think, 'Oh, my gosh, that is so cool! I want to do that! When I become an author, I want to be able to do things in parentheses.' I liked the power of putting things in brackets." Narnia also introduced him to literary awards, specifically the 1956 Carnegie Medal won by the concluding volume. When Gaiman won the 2010 Medal himself, the press reported him recalling, "it had to be the most important literary award there ever was" and observing, "if you can make yourself aged seven happy, you're really doing well – it's like writing a letter to yourself aged seven."

Lewis Carroll's Alice's Adventures in Wonderland was another childhood favourite, and "a favourite forever. Alice was default reading to the point where I knew it by heart." He also enjoyed Batman comics as a child.

Gaiman was educated at several Church of England schools, including Fonthill School in East Grinstead, Ardingly College (1970–1974), and Whitgift School in Croydon (1974–1977). His father's position as a public relations official of the Church of Scientology was the cause of the seven-year-old Gaiman being forced to withdraw from Fonthill School and return to the school which he had previously attended. He lived in East Grinstead for many years, from 1965 to 1980 and again from 1984 to 1987. 

He met his first wife, Mary McGrath, while she was studying Scientology and living in a house in East Grinstead that was owned by his father. The couple were married in 1985 after having their first child, Michael.

Career

Journalism, early writings, and literary influences
Writers that Gaiman has mentioned as significant influences include C. S. Lewis, J. R. R. Tolkien, Lewis Carroll, Mary Shelley, Rudyard Kipling, Edgar Allan Poe, Michael Moorcock, Dave Sim, Alan Moore, Steve Ditko, Will Eisner, Ursula K. Le Guin, Harlan Ellison, Lord Dunsany, and G. K. Chesterton. A lifetime fan of the Monty Python comedy troupe, as a teenager he owned a copy of Monty Python's Big Red Book. During a trip to France when he was 13, Gaiman became fascinated with the visually fantastic world in the stories of Metal Hurlant, even though he could not understand the words. 

When he was 19 or 20 years old, he contacted his favourite science fiction writer, R. A. Lafferty, whom he discovered when he was nine, and asked for advice on becoming an author along with a Lafferty pastiche he had written. The writer sent Gaiman an encouraging and informative letter back, along with literary advice.

Gaiman has said Roger Zelazny was the author who influenced him the most, with this influence particularly seen in Gaiman's literary style and the topics he writes about. Other authors Gaiman says "furnished the inside of my mind and set me to writing" include  Samuel R. Delany and Angela Carter. Gaiman takes inspiration from the folk tales tradition, citing Otta F Swire's book on the legends of the Isle of Skye as his inspiration for The Truth Is a Cave in the Black Mountains.

In the early 1980s, Gaiman pursued journalism, conducting interviews and writing book reviews, as a means to learn about the world and to make connections that he hoped would later assist him in getting published. He wrote and reviewed extensively for the British Fantasy Society. His first professional short story publication was "Featherquest", a fantasy story, in Imagine Magazine in May 1984.

When waiting for a train at London's Victoria Station in 1984, Gaiman noticed a copy of Swamp Thing written by Alan Moore, and carefully read it. Moore's fresh and vigorous approach to comics had such an impact on Gaiman that he later wrote "that was the final straw, what was left of my resistance crumbled. I proceeded to make regular and frequent visits to London's Forbidden Planet shop to buy comics".

In 1984, he wrote his first book, a biography of the band Duran Duran, as well as Ghastly Beyond Belief, a book of quotations, with Kim Newman. Although Gaiman thought he had done a terrible job, the book's first edition sold out very quickly. When he went to relinquish his rights to the book, he discovered the publisher had gone bankrupt. After this, he was offered a job by Penthouse. He refused the offer.

He also wrote interviews and articles for many British magazines, including Knave. During this he sometimes wrote under pseudonyms, including Gerry Musgrave, Richard Grey, and "a couple of house names". Gaiman has said he ended his journalism career in 1987 because British newspapers regularly publish untruths as fact.
In the late 1980s, he wrote Don't Panic: The Official Hitchhiker's Guide to the Galaxy Companion in what he calls a "classic English humour" style. 

Following this, he wrote the opening of what became his collaboration with fellow English author Terry Pratchett on the comic novel Good Omens about the impending apocalypse.

Comics

After forming a friendship with comic-book writer Alan Moore, who taught him how to write comic scripts,  Gaiman started writing comic books and picked up Miracleman after Moore finished his run on the series. He continued his professional relationship with Moore by contributing quotations for the supplemental materials in the Watchmen comic book series.

Gaiman and artist Mark Buckingham collaborated on several issues of the series before its publisher, Eclipse Comics, collapsed, leaving the series unfinished. His first published comic strips were four short Future Shocks for 2000 AD in 1986–87. He wrote three graphic novels with his favorite collaborator and long-time friend Dave McKean: Violent Cases, Signal to Noise, and The Tragical Comedy or Comical Tragedy of Mr. Punch. Impressed with his work, DC Comics hired him in February 1987, and he wrote the limited series Black Orchid. Karen Berger, who later became head of DC Comics's Vertigo, read Black Orchid and offered Gaiman a job: to re-write an old character, The Sandman, but to put his own spin on him.

The Sandman tells the tale of the ageless, anthropomorphic personification of Dream that is known by many names, including Morpheus. The series began in January 1989 and concluded in March 1996. In the eighth issue of The Sandman, Gaiman and artist Mike Dringenberg introduced Death, the older sister of Dream, who became as popular as the series' title character. The limited series Death: The High Cost of Living launched DC's Vertigo line in 1993. The 75 issues of the regular series, along with an illustrated prose text and a special containing seven short stories, have been collected into 12 volumes that remain in print, 14 if the Death: The High Cost of Living and Death: The Time of Your Life spin-offs are included. Artists include Sam Kieth, Mike Dringenberg, Jill Thompson, Shawn McManus, Marc Hempel and Michael Zulli, lettering by Todd Klein, colours by Daniel Vozzo, and covers by Dave McKean. The series became one of DC's top selling titles, eclipsing even Batman and Superman. Comics historian Les Daniels called Gaiman's work "astonishing" and noted that The Sandman was "a mixture of fantasy, horror, and ironic humor such as comic books had never seen before". DC Comics writer and executive Paul Levitz observed that "The Sandman became the first extraordinary success as a series of graphic novel collections, reaching out and converting new readers to the medium, particularly young women on college campuses, and making Gaiman himself into an iconic cultural figure."

Gaiman and Jamie Delano were to become co-writers of the Swamp Thing series following Rick Veitch. An editorial decision by DC to censor Veitch's final storyline caused both Gaiman and Delano to withdraw from the title.

Gaiman produced two stories for DC's Secret Origins series in 1989. A Poison Ivy tale drawn by Mark Buckingham and a Riddler story illustrated by Bernie Mireault and Matt Wagner. A story that Gaiman originally wrote for Action Comics Weekly in 1989 was shelved due to editorial concerns but it was finally published in 2000 as Green Lantern/Superman: Legend of the Green Flame.

In 1990, Gaiman wrote The Books of Magic, a four-part mini-series that provided a tour of the mythological and magical parts of the DC Universe through a frame story about an English teenager who discovers that he is destined to be the world's greatest wizard. The miniseries was popular, and sired an ongoing series written by John Ney Rieber.

Gaiman's adaptation of Sweeney Todd, illustrated by Michael Zulli for Stephen R. Bissette's publication Taboo, was stopped when the anthology itself was discontinued.

In the mid-1990s, he also created a number of new characters and a setting that was to be featured in a title published by Tekno Comix. The concepts were then altered and split between three titles set in the same continuity:  Lady Justice, Mr. Hero the Newmatic Man, and Teknophage, and tie-ins. Although Gaiman's name appeared prominently as creator of the characters, he was not involved in writing any of the above-mentioned books.

Gaiman wrote a semi-autobiographical story about a boy's fascination with Michael Moorcock's anti-hero Elric of Melniboné for Ed Kramer's anthology Tales of the White Wolf. In 1996, Gaiman and Ed Kramer co-edited The Sandman: Book of Dreams. Nominated for the British Fantasy Award, the original fiction anthology featured stories and contributions by Tori Amos, Clive Barker, Gene Wolfe, Tad Williams, and others.

Asked why he likes comics more than other forms of storytelling, Gaiman said: 

Gaiman wrote two series for Marvel Comics. Marvel 1602 was an eight-issue limited series published from November 2003 to June 2004 with art by Andy Kubert and Richard Isanove. The Eternals was a seven-issue limited series drawn by John Romita Jr., which was published from August 2006 to March 2007.

In 2009, Gaiman wrote a two-part Batman story for DC Comics to follow Batman R.I.P. titled "Whatever Happened to the Caped Crusader?" a play-off of the classic Superman story "Whatever Happened to the Man of Tomorrow?" by Alan Moore. He contributed a twelve-part Metamorpho serial drawn by Mike Allred for Wednesday Comics, a weekly newspaper-style series. Gaiman and Paul Cornell co-wrote Action Comics #894 (December 2010), which featured an appearance by Death. In October 2013, DC Comics released The Sandman: Overture with art by J. H. Williams III. Gaiman's Angela character was introduced into the Marvel Universe in the last issue of the Age of Ultron miniseries in 2013.

Gaiman oversaw The Sandman Universe, a line of comic books published by Vertigo. The four series — House of Whispers, Lucifer, The Books of Magic, and The Dreaming — were written by new creative teams. The line launched on 8 August 2018.

Novels

In a collaboration with author Terry Pratchett, best known for his series of Discworld novels, Gaiman's first novel Good Omens was published in 1990. In 2011 Pratchett said that while the entire novel was a collaborative effort and most of the ideas could be credited to both of them, Pratchett did a larger portion of writing and editing if for no other reason than Gaiman's scheduled involvement with Sandman.

The 1996 novelisation of Gaiman's teleplay for the BBC mini-series Neverwhere was his first solo novel. The novel was released in tandem with the television series though it presents some notable differences from the television series. Gaiman has since revised the novel twice, the first time for an American audience unfamiliar with the London Underground, the second time because he felt unsatisfied with the originals.

In 1999, first printings of his fantasy novel Stardust were released. The novel has been released both as a standard novel and in an illustrated text edition. This novel was highly influenced by Victorian fairytales and culture.

American Gods became one of Gaiman's best-selling and multi-award-winning novels upon its release in 2001. A special 10th Anniversary edition was released, with the "author's preferred text" 12,000 words longer than the original mass-market editions.

Gaiman has not written a direct sequel to American Gods but he has revisited the characters. A glimpse at Shadow's travels in Europe is found in a short story which finds him in Scotland, applying the same concepts developed in American Gods to the story of Beowulf. The 2005 novel Anansi Boys deals with Anansi ('Mr. Nancy'), tracing the relationship of his two sons, one semi-divine and the other an unassuming bookkeeper, as they explore their common heritage. It debuted at number one on The New York Times Best Seller list.

In late 2008, Gaiman released a new children's book, The Graveyard Book. It follows the adventures of a boy named Bod after his family is murdered and he is left to be brought up by a graveyard. It is heavily influenced by Rudyard Kipling's The Jungle Book. , it had been on The New York Times Bestseller children's list for fifteen weeks.

In 2013, The Ocean at the End of the Lane was voted Book of the Year in the British National Book Awards. The novel follows an unnamed man who returns to his hometown for a funeral and remembers events that began forty years earlier. Themes include the search for self-identity and the "disconnect between childhood and adulthood".

In September 2016, Neil Gaiman announced that he had been working for some years on retellings of Norse mythology. Norse Mythology was released in February 2017.

Several of his novels have been published as paperbacks with retro covers by artist Robert McGinnis.

Film and screenwriting

Gaiman wrote the 1996 BBC dark fantasy television series Neverwhere. He cowrote the screenplay for the movie MirrorMask with his old friend Dave McKean for McKean to direct. In addition, he wrote the localised English language script to the anime movie Princess Mononoke, based on a translation of the Japanese script.

After his disappointment with the production limitations of Neverwhere, Gaiman asked his agent to pull him out an unnamed UK television series that was to begin production immediately afterward. "I didn't want to do it unless I had more control than you get as a writer: in fantasy, the tone of voice, the look and feel, the way something is shot and edited is vital, and I wanted to be in charge of that."

He cowrote the script for Robert Zemeckis's Beowulf with Roger Avary, a collaboration that has proved productive for both writers. Gaiman has expressed interest in collaborating on a film adaptation of the Epic of Gilgamesh.

He was the only person other than J. Michael Straczynski to write a Babylon 5 script in the series' last three seasons, contributing the season five episode "Day of the Dead". The series also features a recurring alien race called the Gaim, who resemble the character of Dream and are named after Gaiman.

Gaiman has also written at least three drafts of a screenplay adaptation of Nicholson Baker's novel The Fermata for director Robert Zemeckis, although the project was stalled while Zemeckis made The Polar Express and the Gaiman-Roger Avary written Beowulf film.

Neil Gaiman was featured in the History Channel documentary Comic Book Superheroes Unmasked.

Several of Gaiman's original works have been optioned or greenlighted for film adaptation, most notably Stardust, which premiered in August 2007 and stars Charlie Cox, Robert De Niro, Michelle Pfeiffer, Claire Danes and Mark Strong, directed by Matthew Vaughn. A stop-motion version of Coraline was released on 6 February 2009, with Henry Selick directing and Dakota Fanning and Teri Hatcher in the leading voice-actor roles.

In 2007, Gaiman announced that after ten years in development, the feature film of Death: The High Cost of Living would finally begin production with a screenplay by Gaiman that he would direct for Warner Independent. Gaiman said that he agreed to direct the film "with the carrot dangled in front of me that I could direct it. And we'll see if that happens, and if I'm a good director or not." Don Murphy and Susan Montford were named as producers, and Guillermo del Toro was named as the film's executive producer. By 2010, it had been reported that the film was no longer in production.

Seeing Ear Theatre performed two of Gaiman's audio theatre plays, "Snow, Glass, Apples", Gaiman's retelling of Snow White, and "Murder Mysteries", a story of heaven before the Fall in which the first crime is committed. Both audio plays were published in the collection Smoke and Mirrors in 1998.

At Guillermo del Toro's request, he rewrote the opening of Hellboy II: The Golden Army to make it look more like a fairy tale.

Gaiman's 2009 Newbery Medal winning book The Graveyard Book will be made into a movie, with Ron Howard as the director.

Gaiman wrote an episode of the long-running BBC science fiction series Doctor Who, broadcast in 2011 during Matt Smith's second series as the Doctor. Shooting began in August 2010 for this episode, the original title of which was "The House of Nothing" but which was eventually transmitted as "The Doctor's Wife". The episode won the 2012 Hugo Award for Best Dramatic Presentation (Short Form). Gaiman made his return to Doctor Who with an episode titled "Nightmare in Silver", broadcast on 11 May 2013.

In 2011, it was announced that Gaiman would be writing the script to a new film version of Journey to the West.

Gaiman appeared as himself on The Simpsons episode "The Book Job", which broadcast on 20 November 2011.

In 2015, Starz greenlighted a series adaptation of Gaiman's novel American Gods. Bryan Fuller and Michael Green wrote and showrun the series.

In 2020, Gaiman received a Hugo Award for Best Dramatic Presentation, Long Form for the TV miniseries adaption of Good Omens, for which he wrote the screenplay.

Radio
A six-part radio play of Neverwhere was broadcast in March 2013, adapted by Dirk Maggs for BBC Radio 4 and Radio 4 Extra. Featured stars include James McAvoy as Richard, Natalie Dormer, Benedict Cumberbatch, Christopher Lee, Bernard Cribbens and Johnny Vegas.

In September 2014, Gaiman and Terry Pratchett joined forces with BBC Radio 4 to make the first ever dramatisation of their co-penned novel Good Omens, which was broadcast in December in five half-hour episodes and culminated in an hour-long final apocalyptic showdown. In 2021, Gaiman was cast as Duke Aubrey in an adaptation of Hope Mirrlees' Lud-in-the-Mist, a novel Gaiman had previously proclaimed one of his favourites (and contributed a foreword for an edition by Cold Spring Press), for BBC Radio 4.

Public performances
Gaiman frequently performs public readings from his stories and poetry, and has toured with his wife, musician Amanda Palmer. In some of these performances he has also sung songs, in "a novelist's version of singing", despite having "no kind of singing voice".

In 2015, Gaiman delivered a 100-minute lecture for the Long Now Foundation entitled How Stories Last about the nature of storytelling and how stories persist in human culture. In April 2018, Gaiman made a guest appearance on the television show The Big Bang Theory, and his tweet about the show's fictional comic book store becomes the central theme of the episode "The Comet Polarization".

Blog and Twitter
In February 2001, when Gaiman had completed writing American Gods, his publishers set up a promotional website featuring a weblog in which Gaiman described the day-to-day process of revising, publishing, and promoting the novel. After the novel was published, the website evolved into a more general Official Neil Gaiman Website.

Gaiman generally posts to the blog describing the day-to-day process of being Neil Gaiman and writing, revising, publishing, or promoting whatever the current project is. He also posts reader emails and answers questions, which gives him unusually direct and immediate interaction with fans. One of his answers on why he writes the blog is "because writing is, like death, a lonely business."

The original American Gods blog was extracted for publication in the NESFA Press collection of Gaiman miscellany, Adventures in the Dream Trade.

To celebrate the seventh anniversary of the blog, the novel American Gods was provided free of charge online for a month.

Gaiman is an active user of the social networking site Twitter with over 2.7 million followers , using the username @neilhimself. In 2013, Gaiman was named by IGN as one of "The Best Tweeters in Comics", describing his posts as "sublime." Gaiman also runs a Tumblr account on which he primarily answers fan questions.

In January 2022, when the board of trustees of McMinn County Schools in Tennessee, in a 10-0 decision, removed the Pulitzer Prize-winning Holocaust graphic novel Maus from its curriculum for 8th grade English classes, overriding a State curriculum decision, Gaiman was critical of the decision. He tweeted: "There's only one kind of people who would vote to ban Maus, whatever they are calling themselves these days."

Use of fountain pens
Gaiman is a dedicated user of fountain pens and has said that he writes the first draft of all his books with one. He began this practice with Stardust, which he wrote in fountain pen in order to capture the feeling of the 1920s. He is most closely associated with the Pilot 823, one of which he has said he has used for giving over one million signatures.

Filmography

Personal life

Gaiman has lived near Menomonie, Wisconsin, since 1992. Gaiman moved there to be close to the family of his then-wife, Mary McGrath, with whom he has three children. , Gaiman also resides in Cambridge, Massachusetts. In 2014, he took up a five-year appointment as professor in the arts at Bard College, in Annandale-on-Hudson, New York.

Gaiman is married to songwriter and performer Amanda Palmer, with whom he has an open marriage. The couple announced that they were dating in June 2009, and announced their engagement on Twitter on 1 January 2010. On 16 November 2010, Palmer hosted a non-legally-binding flash mob wedding for Gaiman's birthday in New Orleans. They were legally married on 2 January 2011. The wedding took place in the parlour of writers Ayelet Waldman and Michael Chabon. On marrying Palmer, he took her middle name, MacKinnon, as one of his names. In September 2015, they had a son.

In March 2020, Gaiman, Palmer, and their son were in Havelock North, Hawke's Bay, when New Zealand's government announced that, due to the COVID-19 pandemic, the whole country would move to COVID-19 Alert Level 4: complete lockdown and quarantining of people within their own homes. In May 2020, Gaiman travelled from New Zealand to his holiday home on the Isle of Skye, breaking the lockdown rules. Ross, Skye and Lochaber MP Ian Blackford described his behaviour as unacceptable and dangerous. Gaiman published an apology on his website, saying he had endangered the local community. After Gaiman's departure, Palmer announced on her Patreon that she and Gaiman had separated and requested privacy. Gaiman stated in a blog post that their split was "my fault, I'm afraid" and also requesting privacy. The couple later released a joint statement clarifying that they were not, however, getting divorced. They reconciled in 2021, but in November 2022 they released a joint statement to announce they were divorcing.

Advocacy
In 2016, Gaiman, as well as several prominent celebrities, appeared in the video "What They Took With Them", from the United Nations High Commissioner for Refugees, to help raise awareness of the issue of global refugees.

Gaiman is a supporter of the Comic Book Legal Defense Fund and has served on its board of directors. In 2013, Gaiman was named co-chair of the organization's newly formed advisory board.

In 2022 during Russian invasion of Ukraine Gaiman supported Ukraine by announcing on Twitter that he doesn't want to renew contracts with Russian publishers. The writer also encouraged donations to Ukrainian refugees.

Friendship with Tori Amos
One of Gaiman's most commented-upon friendships is with the musician Tori Amos, a Sandman fan who became friends with Gaiman after making a reference to "Neil and the Dream King" on her 1991 demo tape. He included her in turn as a character (a talking tree) in his novel Stardust. Amos also mentions Gaiman in her songs, "Tear in Your Hand" ("If you need me, me and Neil'll be hangin' out with the dream king. Neil says hi by the way"), "Space Dog" ("Where's Neil when you need him?"), "Horses" ("But will you find me if Neil makes me a tree?"), "Carbon" ("Get me Neil on the line, no I can't hold. Have him read, 'Snow, Glass, Apples' where nothing is what it seems"), "Sweet Dreams" ("You're forgetting to fly, darling, when you sleep"), and "Not Dying Today" ("Neil is thrilled he can claim he's mammalian, 'but the bad news,' he said, 'girl you're a dandelion'"). He also wrote stories for the tour book of Boys for Pele and Scarlet's Walk, a letter for the tour book of American Doll Posse, and the stories behind each girl in her album Strange Little Girls. Amos penned the introduction for his novel Death: the High Cost of Living, and posed for the cover. She also wrote a song called "Sister Named Desire" based on his Sandman character, which was included on his anthology, Where's Neil When You Need Him?.

Gaiman is godfather to Tori Amos's daughter Tash, and wrote a poem called "Blueberry Girl" for Tori and Tash. The poem has been turned into a book by the illustrator Charles Vess. Gaiman read the poem aloud to an audience at the Sundance Kabuki Theater in San Francisco on 5 October 2008 during his book reading tour for The Graveyard Book. It was published in March 2009 with the title Blueberry Girl.

Litigation
In 1993, Gaiman was contracted by Todd McFarlane to write a single issue of Spawn, a popular title at the newly created Image Comics company. McFarlane was promoting his new title by having guest authors Gaiman, Alan Moore, Frank Miller, and Dave Sim each write a single issue.

In issue No. 9 of the series, Gaiman introduced the characters Angela, Cogliostro, and Medieval Spawn. Prior to this issue, Spawn was an assassin who worked for the government and came back as a reluctant agent of Hell but had no real direction in his actions. In Angela, a cruel and malicious angel, Gaiman introduced a character who threatened Spawn's existence, as well as providing a moral opposite. Cogliostro was introduced as a mentor character for exposition and instruction, providing guidance. Medieval Spawn introduced a history and precedent that not all Spawns were self-serving or evil, giving additional character development to Malebolgia, the demon that creates Hellspawn.

As intended, all three characters were used repeatedly throughout the next decade by Todd McFarlane within the wider Spawn universe. In papers filed by  Gaiman in early 2002, however, he claimed that the characters were jointly owned by their scripter (himself) and artist (McFarlane), not merely by McFarlane in his role as the creator of the series. Disagreement over who owned the rights to a character was the primary motivation for McFarlane and other artists to form Image Comics (although that argument related more towards disagreements between writers and artists as character creators). As McFarlane used the characters without Gaiman's permission or royalty payments, Gaiman believed his copyrighted work was being infringed upon, which violated their original oral agreement. McFarlane initially agreed that Gaiman had not signed away any rights to the characters, and negotiated with Gaiman to effectively "swap" McFarlane's interest in the character Marvelman. McFarlane had purchased interest in the character when Eclipse Comics was liquidated while Gaiman was interested in being able to continue his aborted run of the Marvelman title. McFarlane later changed his initial position, claiming that Gaiman's work had only been work-for-hire and that McFarlane owned all of Gaiman's creations entirely. The presiding judge, however, ruled against their agreement being work for hire, based in large part on the legal requirement that "copyright assignments must be in writing."

The Seventh Circuit Court of Appeals upheld the district court ruling in February 2004 granting joint ownership of the characters to Gaiman and McFarlane. On the specific issue of Cogliostro, presiding Judge John C. Shabaz proclaimed, "The expressive work that is the comic-book character Count Nicholas Cogliostro was the joint work of Gaiman and McFarlane—their contributions strike us as quite equal—and both are entitled to ownership of the copyright". Similar analysis led to similar results for the other two characters, Angela and Medieval Spawn.

This legal battle was brought by Gaiman and the specifically formed Marvels and Miracles, LLC, which Gaiman had previously created to help sort out the legal rights surrounding Marvelman. Gaiman had written Marvel 1602 in 2003 to help fund this project and all of Gaiman's profits for the original issues of the series were donated to Marvels and Miracles. The rights to Marvelman were subsequently purchased, from original creator Mick Anglo, by Marvel Comics in 2009.

Gaiman returned to court again over the Spawn characters Dark Ages Spawn, Domina and Tiffany, claiming that they were "derivative of the three he co-created with McFarlane." The judge ruled that Gaiman was right in these claims as well and gave McFarlane until the beginning of September 2010 to settle the matter.

Audiobooks 
 The Sandman (narrated by Neil Gaiman), Audible Originals 2021, 
 Stardust (read by Neil Gaiman), HarperAudio 2013, 
 Neverwhere (read by Neil Gaiman), HarperAudio 2017, 
 Norse Mythology (read by Neil Gaiman), HarperAudio 2017,

Literary allusions
Gaiman's work is known for a high degree of allusiveness. Dr. Meredith Collins, for instance, has commented upon the degree to which his novel Stardust depends on allusions to Victorian fairy tales and culture. Particularly in The Sandman, literary figures and characters appear often; the character of Fiddler's Green is modelled visually on G. K. Chesterton, both William Shakespeare and Geoffrey Chaucer appear as characters, as do several characters from within A Midsummer Night's Dream and The Tempest. The comic also draws from numerous mythologies and historical periods.

Analyzing Gaiman's The Graveyard Book, bibliographer and librarian Richard Bleiler detects patterns of and allusions to the Gothic novel, from Horace Walpole's The Castle of Otranto to Shirley Jackson's The Haunting of Hill House. He concludes that Gaiman is "utilizing works, characters, themes, and settings that generations of scholars have identified and classified as Gothic, ... [yet] subverts them and develops the novel by focusing on the positive aspects of maturation, concentrating on the values of learning, friendship, and sacrifice." Regarding another work's assumed connection and allusions to this form, Gaiman himself quipped: "I've never been able to figure out whether Sandman is a gothic."

Clay Smith has argued that this sort of allusiveness serves to situate Gaiman as a strong authorial presence in his own works, often to the exclusion of his collaborators. However, Smith's viewpoint is in the minority: to many, if there is a problem with Gaiman scholarship and intertextuality it is that "... his literary merit and vast popularity have propelled him into the nascent comics canon so quickly that there is not yet a basis of critical scholarship about his work."

David Rudd takes a more generous view in his study of the novel Coraline, where he argues that the work plays and riffs productively on Sigmund Freud's notion of the Uncanny, or the Unheimlich.

Though Gaiman's work is frequently seen as exemplifying the monomyth structure laid out in Joseph Campbell's The Hero with a Thousand Faces, Gaiman says that he started reading The Hero with a Thousand Faces but refused to finish it: "I think I got about half way through The Hero with a Thousand Faces and found myself thinking if this is true – I don't want to know. I really would rather not know this stuff. I'd rather do it because it's true and because I accidentally wind up creating something that falls into this pattern than be told what the pattern is."

Selected awards and honours

 From 1991 to 1993, Gaiman won Harvey Awards in the following categories:
 1991 Best Writer for The Sandman
 1992 Best Writer for The Sandman
 1993 Best Continuing or Limited Series for The Sandman
 From 1991 to 2014, Gaiman won Locus Awards in the following categories:
 1991 Best Fantasy Novel (runner-up) for Good Omens by Gaiman and Terry Pratchett
 1999 Best Fantasy Novel (runner-up) for Stardust
 2002 Best Fantasy Novel for American Gods
 2003 Best Young Adult Book for Coraline
 2004 Best Novelette for "A Study in Emerald"
 2005 Best Short Story for "Forbidden Brides of the Faceless Slaves in the Nameless House of the Night of Dread Desire"
 2006 Best Fantasy novel for Anansi Boys. The book was also nominated for a Hugo Award, but Gaiman asked for it to be withdrawn from the list, stating that he wanted to give other writers a chance and that it was really more fantasy than science fiction.
 2006 Best Short Story for "Sunbird"
 2007 Best Short Story for "How to Talk to Girls at Parties"
 2007 Best Collection for Fragile Things
 2009 Best Young Adult novel for The Graveyard Book
 2010 Best Short Story for An Invocation of Incuriosity, published in Songs of the Dying Earth
 2011 Best Short Story for The Thing About Cassandra, published in Songs of Love and Death
 2011 Best Novelette for The Truth Is A Cave In The Black Mountains, published in Stories
 2014 Best Fantasy Novel for The Ocean at the End of the Lane
 From 1991 to 2022, Gaiman won Eisner Awards in the following categories:
 1991 Best Continuing Series: Sandman, by Neil Gaiman and various artists (DC)
 1991 Best Graphic Album–Reprint: Sandman: The Doll's House by Neil Gaiman and various artists (DC)
 1991 Best Writer: Neil Gaiman, Sandman (DC)
 1992 Best Single Issue or Story: Sandman #22-#28: "Season of Mists," by Neil Gaiman and various artists (DC)
 1992 Best Continuing Series: Sandman, by Neil Gaiman and various artists (DC)
 1992 Best Writer: Neil Gaiman, Sandman, Books of Magic (DC), Miracleman (Eclipse)
 1993 Best Continuing Series: Sandman by Neil Gaiman and various artists (DC)
 1993 Best Graphic Album–New: Signal to Noise by Neil Gaiman and Dave McKean (VG Graphics/Dark Horse)
 1993 Best Writer: Neil Gaiman, Miracleman (Eclipse); Sandman (DC)
 1994 Best Writer: Neil Gaiman, Sandman (DC/Vertigo); Death: The High Cost of Living (DC/Vertigo)
 2000 Best Comics-Related Book: The Sandman: The Dream Hunters, by Neil Gaiman and Yoshitaka Amano (DC/Vertigo)
 2004 Best Short Story: "Death," by Neil Gaiman and P. Craig Russell, in The Sandman: Endless Nights (Vertigo/DC)
 2004 Best Anthology: The Sandman: Endless Nights, by Neil Gaiman and others, edited by Karen Berger and Shelly Bond (Vertigo/DC)
 2007 Best Archival Collection/Project–Comic Books: Absolute Sandman, vol. 1, by Neil Gaiman and various (Vertigo/DC)
 2009 Best Publication for Teens/Tweens: Coraline, by Neil Gaiman, adapted by P. Craig Russell (HarperCollins Children's Books)
 2020 Best Adaptation from Another Medium: Neil Gaiman's Snow, Glass, Apples by Neil Gaiman and Colleen Doran (Dark Horse Comics)
 2021 Inducted into the Will Eisner Award Hall of Fame
 2022 Best Graphic Album--Reprint: The Complete American Gods by Neil Gaiman, P. Craig Russell, and Scott Hampton (Dark Horse)
 In 1991, Gaiman received an Inkpot Award at the San Diego Comic-Con International 
 From 2000 to 2004, Gaiman won Bram Stoker Awards in the following categories:
 2000 Best Illustrated Narrative for The Sandman: The Dream Hunters
 2001 Best Novel for American Gods
 2003 Best Work for Young Readers for Coraline
 2004 Best Illustrated Narrative for The Sandman: Endless Nights
 From 2002 to 2020, Gaiman won Hugo Awards in the following categories:
 2002 Best Novel for American Gods
 2003 Best Novella for Coraline
 2004 Best Short Story for A Study in Emerald (in a ceremony the author presided over himself, having volunteered for the job before his story was nominated)
 2009 Best Novel for The Graveyard Book presented at the 2009 Worldcon in Montreal where he was also the Professional Guest of Honor.
 2012 Best Dramatic Presentation (Short Form) for "The Doctor's Wife"
 2016 Best Graphic Story for The Sandman: Overture
 2020 Best Dramatic Presentation, Long Form, for Good Omens
 From 2002 to 2003, Gaiman won Nebula Awards in the following categories:
 2002 Best Novel for American Gods
 2003 Best Novella for Coraline
 From 2006 to 2010, Gaiman won British Fantasy Awards in the following categories:
 2006 Best Novel for Anansi Boys
 2007 British Fantasy Award, collection, for Fragile Things
 2009 British Fantasy Award for Best Novel shortlist for The Graveyard Book
 2010 British Fantasy Award, comic/graphic novel, Whatever Happened to the Caped Crusader?, by Gaiman and Andy Kubert
 In 2010, Gaiman won Shirley Jackson Awards in the following categories:
 2010 Best Novelette for "The Truth Is A Cave In The Black Mountains"
 2010 Best Edited Anthology for Stories: All New Tales, edited by Neil Gaiman and Al Sarrantonio (William Morrow)
 1991 World Fantasy Award for short fiction for the Sandman issue, "A Midsummer Night's Dream", by Gaiman and Charles Vess
 1991–1993 Comics Buyer's Guide Award for Favorite Writer
 1997–2000 Comics Buyer's Guide Award for Favorite Writer nominations
 1997 Comic Book Legal Defense Fund Defender of Liberty award
 1999 Mythopoeic Fantasy Award for Adult Literature for the illustrated version of Stardust
 2003 British Science Fiction Association Award, short fiction, for Coraline
 2004 Angoulême International Comics Festival Prize for Scenario for The Sandman: Season of Mists
 2005 The William Shatner Golden Groundhog Award for Best Underground Movie, nomination for MirrorMask. The other nominated films were Green Street Hooligans, Nine Lives, Up for Grabs, and Opie Gets Laid.
 2005 Quill Book Award for Graphic Novels for Marvel 1602
 2006 Mythopoeic Fantasy Award for Adult Literature for Anansi Boys
 2007 Bob Clampett Humanitarian Award
 2007 Comic-Con Icon award presented at the Scream Awards.
 2009 Newbery Medal for The Graveyard Book
 2009 Audie Award: Children's 8–12 and Audiobook of the year for the audio version of The Graveyard Book.
 2009 The Booktrust Teenage Prize for The Graveyard Book
 2010 Gaiman was selected as the Honorary Chair of National Library Week by the American Library Association.
 2010 Carnegie Medal for The Graveyard Book, becoming the first author to have won both the Carnegie and Newbery Medals for the same work.
 2011 Ray Bradbury Award for Outstanding Dramatic Presentation (with Richard Clark) for The Doctor's Wife
 2012 Honorary Doctorate of Arts from the University of the Arts
 2013 National Book Awards (British), Book of the Year winner for The Ocean at the End of the Lane
 2016 University of St Andrews Honorary degree of Doctor of Letters
2018 Nomination for the New Academy Prize in Literature.
 2019 Barnes & Noble Writers for Writers Award, "celebrat[ing] authors who have given generously to other writers or to the broader literary community." Gaiman was given the award "for advocating for freedom of expression worldwide and inspiring countless writers."

Bibliography

References

External links

 
 Neil Gaiman Visual Bibliography
 Neil Gaiman's Children's Books 
 
 In-depth interview: Neil Gaiman in conversation with Tom Chatfield in Prospect magazine

At other web sites 
 
 
 
 
 
 
 
 

 
1960 births
Living people
20th-century English novelists
21st-century British novelists
8in8 members
Articles containing video clips
Audiobook narrators
Bard College faculty
Bob Clampett Humanitarian Award winners
British beekeepers
British Jews
British male bloggers
Carnegie Medal in Literature winners
Cthulhu Mythos writers
DC Comics people
Eisner Award winners for Best Writer
English agnostics
English bloggers
English children's writers
English comics writers
English expatriates in the United States
English fantasy writers
English graphic novelists
English horror writers
English Jewish writers
English male journalists
English male screenwriters
English male short story writers
English people of Polish-Jewish descent
English science fiction writers
English screenwriters
English short story writers
Ghost story writers
Harvey Award winners for Best Writer
Hugo Award-winning writers
Inkpot Award winners
Jewish agnostics
Magic realism writers
Marvel Comics writers
Nebula Award winners
Newbery Medal winners
People educated at Ardingly College
People educated at Whitgift School
People from Menomonie, Wisconsin
People from Portchester
Postmodern writers
Shorty Award winners
The Books of Magic
The Sandman (comic book)
Weird fiction writers